Coilia, the grenadier anchovies, is a genus of anchovies. It currently contains 12–13 species.

It derives its generic name coilia from the Greek koilia, meaning "hollow" or "abdomen".

Species
There are 12 or 13 species:
 Coilia borneensis Bleeker, 1852 (Bornean grenadier anchovy)
 Coilia brachygnathus Kreyenberg & Pappenheim, 1908 (Yangtze grenadier anchovy)
 Coilia coomansi Hardenberg, 1934 (Cooman's grenadier anchovy)
 Coilia dussumieri Valenciennes, 1848 (Goldspotted grenadier anchovy)
 Coilia grayii J. Richardson, 1845 (Gray's grenadier anchovy)
 Coilia lindmani Bleeker, 1858 (Lindman's grenadier anchovy)
 Coilia macrognathos Bleeker, 1852 (Longjaw grenadier anchovy)
 Coilia mystus (Linnaeus, 1758) (Osbeck's grenadier anchovy)
 Coilia nasus Temminck & Schlegel, 1846 (Japanese grenadier anchovy)
 Coilia neglecta Whitehead, 1967 (Neglected grenadier anchovy)
 Coilia ramcarati (F. Hamilton, 1822) (Ramcarat grenadier anchovy)
 Coilia rebentischii Bleeker, 1858 (Many-fingered grenadier anchovy)
 Coilia reynaldi Valenciennes, 1848 (Reynald's grenadier anchovy)

The Catalog of Fishes considers Coilia brachygnathus to be a synonym of Coilia nasus, hence listing one species less than the FishBase.

References

  
Ray-finned fish genera
Taxa named by John Edward Gray